Alberto Savino (born 1 September 1973) is an Italian footballer who currently plays for Nola as a defender.

Career
Born in Pompei, the Province of Naples, Savino started his professional career at Serie C2 side Savoia which is based in Torre Annunziata, located in the Province of Naples. In the summer of 1995, he was signed by Serie B side Brescia. He made his league debut on 10 September 1995, substituting Giandomenico Costi, in the 31st minute. He played for Brescia for 4 seasons, winning a Serie B championship and Serie A promotion in 1997, and followed the team as they were relegated back to Serie B in 1998. After Brescia failed to promoted back to Serie A, Savino was sold to Lecce in co-ownership deal in 1999, at the end of the 1998–99 season, during which Lecce won promotion to Serie A as Serie B 3rd place.

In summer 2002, he followed Lecce as they were relegated back to Serie B. He played the opening match of the season as Lorenzo Stovini's backup, coming on in the 60th minute. He made 4 more starts in 7 more league appearances in October and in November, before leaving on loan to league rivals Napoli in January 2003. Savino returned to Lecce, who had been promoted back to Serie A, but remained an unused sub throughout the entire season, before joining Serie B side Ternana in January 2004.

In summer 2004, he joined Serie C1 side Napoli Soccer (a new company/team founded to replace the recently bankrupted S.S.C. Napoli), but played a half season before joining Serie B strugglers Venezia. The club were relegated and went bankrupt in 2005. He subsequently played a season for his first professional club Savoia but in the non-professional Italian league Serie D. In December 2006, he was signed by Serie C1 side Pavia. In December 2007, he was signed by Serie C2 side Scafatese along with Vincenzo Bevo. In September 2008, he joined Lega Pro Prima Divisione (ex-Serie C1) side Gallipoli.

Honours
Brescia
Serie B: 1996–97

Gallipoli
Lega Pro Prima Divisione: 2009

References

External links
 
 Profile at AIC.Football.it 
 Profile at Laseried.com 

1973 births
Living people
People from Pompei
Italian footballers
Serie A players
Serie B players
S.S. Turris Calcio players
Brescia Calcio players
U.S. Lecce players
S.S.C. Napoli players
Ternana Calcio players
Venezia F.C. players
F.C. Pavia players
S.S. Scafatese Calcio 1922 players
A.S.D. Gallipoli Football 1909 players
F.C. Matera players
Association football defenders
Sportspeople from the Province of Naples
Footballers from Campania